Beauty and the Geek is a British reality television show that first aired on E4 from 7 February to 14 March 2006 and then a second series premiered exclusively on the Discovery+ streaming service since 25 September 2022.

Overview
Beauty and the Geek was first aired in the United Kingdom on E4 on 7 February 2006, following the success of the format in the United States, and was advertised similarly as "the Ultimate Social Experiment". 

Like its US counterpart, the show matches physically attractive, but intellectually challenged women with geeky-looking, socially inept, "genius" men, and have them try to learn from each other. The women try to learn about academia such as rocket science or anatomy from the men, while the men try to learn social skills from the women. Each pair must share a room (for some this meant sleeping in the same bed) in a large Scottish castle (Blairquhan Castle in Ayrshire) that provides the setting for the show for the first series.

Series 1 (2006)
The first series premiered on 7 February 2006 and ended on 14 March 2006 on E4, before being repeated on Channel 4 beginning on 31 March 2006. In the first series there is no host per se, although voiceovers are provided by David Mitchell of Peep Show fame and the physical actions normally requiring a host are performed by a silent "butler" known as "Gates" (actor Alex Purves).

The show began with seven female "beauties" and seven male "geeks". The men and women took turns choosing partners by introducing themselves in gender-divided rooms. Once paired off, the teams worked together to become proficient in unfamiliar areas of study. Their skills are tested in a series of competitions, usually one for the men and one for the women - the winners of which get to choose one team each to go to an elimination round. In the elimination room, the team members face three questions each on their respective areas of study and the team with the most points (or the winner of the tiebreaker in the event of a tie) remains in the competition, with the other team leaving immediately. The last team remaining wins £40,000 to share.

Teams

Challenges and eliminations 

 Notes

Episode progress

 The contestants won the competition.
 The contestant won the challenge and their pair was safe from elimination.
 The contestant's partner won the challenge and they were safe from elimination.
 The contestant did not win the challenge but their pair was safe from elimination.
 The contestant and their partner survived elimination.
 The contestant and their partner was eliminated.

Series 2 (2022)
In 2022, following the success of the rebooted Australian version, streaming service Discovery+ commissioned a new eight-episode British version of the show with Matt Edmondson and Mollie King as hosts. The show was ordered from production company Initial (part of the Banijay group) and was commissioned by Discovery alongside another British dating show called Zodiac Island (with this format coming from Barefaced TV/STV Studios). It began streaming on 25 September 2022. Teams compete for an increased £50,000 prize fund.

Teams

Episode progress 

  The contestants won the competition.
  The contestants claimed the runner-up position in the competition.
  The contestant won the challenge and won a date with their partner and/or was safe from elimination.
  The contestant's partner won the challenge and won a date with their partner and/or was safe from elimination.
  The contestant did not win the challenge but their pair was safe from elimination.
  The contestant and their partner survived elimination.
  The contestant quit the competition, eliminating them and their partner.
  The contestant and their partner was eliminated.
  The contestants were brought back into the competition.
  The contestants competed to return to the competition, but did not succeed.

Challenges and eliminations

References

External links
 
 

2000s British reality television series
2020s British reality television series
2006 British television series debuts
British dating and relationship reality television series
British television series based on American television series
British television series revived after cancellation
Channel 4 reality television shows
English-language television shows
Television series by Banijay